Elizabeth of Hungary (died 1189), was a Duchess consort of Bohemia, married to Frederick, Duke of Bohemia. Her parents were King Géza II of Hungary and Euphrosyne of Kiev. She served as regent of Bohemia twice in the absence of her spouse.

Biography
Elizabeth married Frederick in about the year of 1157.

In 1179, Elizabeth served as regent during the absence of her spouse and as such successfully conducted the defense of Prague toward her brother-in-law Sobeslav II. She appeared herself on the battlefield with clerical insignia on her banner.

In 1184, she repeated the very same fight toward the very same opponent and was again victorious. In 1189, however, she was forced to surrender to Conrad II.

Issue
 Helena of Bohemia (b. 1158); engaged to Peter, son of Manuel I Komnenos, in 1164.
 Sophia of Bohemia (d. 25 May 1185); married Albert I, Margrave of Meissen.
 Ludmilla of Bohemia (d. 14 August 1240); married, firstly, Adalbert VI, Count of Bogen and had issue; married, secondly, Louis I, Duke of Bavaria and had issue.
 Vratislaus of Bohemia (d. 1180)
 Olga of Bohemia (fl. )
 Margaret of Bohemia (d. 28 August 1167)

References 

Duchesses of Bohemia
House of Árpád
Přemyslid dynasty
Hungarian princesses
Year of birth uncertain
Year of death uncertain
12th-century women rulers
1145 births
Women in medieval European warfare
1189 deaths
Women in 12th-century warfare
12th-century Hungarian women
12th-century Hungarian people
12th-century Bohemian women
12th-century Bohemian people
Daughters of kings